Crucibulum striatum, common name the striate cup-and -saucer, is a species of sea snail, a marine gastropod mollusk in the family Calyptraeidae, the slipper snails or slipper limpets, cup-and-saucer snails, and Chinese hat snails.

Distribution

Description 
The maximum recorded shell length is 34 mm.

Habitat 
The minimum recorded depth for this species is 0 m; the maximum recorded depth is 422 m.

References

External links

Calyptraeidae
Gastropods described in 1826